Mohamed Noh bin Rahman (born 2 August 1980) is a retired Singaporean footballer who played as a defender.

A cultured fullback, Noh Rahman's versatility means he can be employed in defence and in midfield for both club and country.

Club career
He has been with Geylang United since the second season of the S-League in 1997. He is considered the most senior player in terms of years spent with the club, and was the vice-captain for the squad.

He is a natural right-back, though he can also play in the defensive midfield, centre-back and left-back positions when the need arises.

He left Geylang in 2009 after 11 years with the club, citing his desire to seek new challenges, and joined Sengkang Punggol along with his former team-mates Aide Iskandar and Amos Boon.

International career
He made his debut for the national team in 2001, in a friendly against Thailand.

He first caught the eye in qualifiers in 2001 for the Korea/Japan World Cup.

Called up by then coach Jan Poulsen to help fill the gap left by the absence of the injured Lim Tong Hai when the veteran full-back sustained a long injury, he shone against the likes of Kyrgyzstan, Kuwait and Bahrain in the 2002 World Cup qualifiers with his intelligent passing and astute positioning.

A debilitating knee injury left him out of sorts for the 2002 Tiger Cup, but he has shown signs of getting back to his best for the Lions.

However, having just recovered from a knee injury, he was rushed to play in the 2002 Tiger Cup opening group match against Malaysia and it came with debilitating consequences. He was out of sorts together with the whole Singapore back line and Singapore lost 4-0 at home as a result. As a result, many left fuming and doubting his ability at the international stage.

Noh was in the squads that won back-to-back titles in the 2004 Tiger Cup and the 2007 ASEAN Football Championship. His brave block to deflect a goal-bound effort away for a corner in the second leg of the 2007 Asean Football Federation Championship final against Thailand has earned him
cult hero status among the Lions' fans.

He was also praised by fans and the media for his excellent performances for the national side for the 2010 FIFA World Cup Qualifiers and its related friendlies.

He was one of the three Singapore players to wear the captain's armband at the 2008 AFF Suzuki Cup, cementing his position as vice-captain of the squad behind Indra Sahdan Daud after starting as captain against Myanmar and Vietnam.

Honours

Club
Geylang United
S-League: 2001
Singapore FA Cup: 1996

International
Singapore
ASEAN Football Championship: 2004, 2007

References

External links

1980 births
Living people
Singaporean footballers
Singapore Premier League players
Singapore international footballers
Association football defenders
Geylang International FC players
Warriors FC players
Hougang United FC players
Home United FC players